Mudegan (also Romanized as Mūdegān) is a village in Gasht Rural District, in the Central District of Fuman County, Gilan Province, Iran. At the 2006 census, its population was 381, in 105 families.

References 

Populated places in Fuman County